Glen Willis is a building in Frankfort, Kentucky that was built as a brick, two-story house in 1815.  A third story was added when it was remodelled by Henry Harrison Murray after 1841.

It was listed on the U.S. National Register of Historic Places in 1972.

See also
Beeches (Frankfort, Kentucky), the one other comparable building on Leestown Pike, also NRHP-listed

References

Houses on the National Register of Historic Places in Kentucky
Houses completed in 1815
Houses in Frankfort, Kentucky
National Register of Historic Places in Frankfort, Kentucky
1815 establishments in Kentucky